Chitinispirillum is a genus of bacteria from the family of Chitinispirillaceae with one known species (Chitinispirillum alkaliphilum). Chitinispirillum alkaliphilum has been isolated from hypersaline lake sediments from the Wadi el Natrun valley in Egypt.

References

Bacteria genera
Monotypic bacteria genera